Thomas was a former community, north of Auburn in the Green River Valley of King County in the U.S. state of Washington. The also defunct community of Christopher stood between Thomas and Auburn. It was left bank of the river. At one time, it had a post office and a school.

The community was named after John M. Thomas, a local resident.

Notes

Former populated places in Washington (state)
Ghost towns in King County, Washington